Stephen Adams (7 September 1959 - 3 March 2017) was an English professional footballer who played as a forward in the Football League for Scarborough and Doncaster Rovers.

He played non-league football before going into coaching.

References
General
 . Retrieved 28 October 2013.
Specific

1959 births
2017 deaths
Footballers from Sheffield
English footballers
Association football forwards
Worksop Town F.C. players
Scarborough F.C. players
Doncaster Rovers F.C. players
Boston United F.C. players
Kettering Town F.C. players
Witton Albion F.C. players
Gateshead F.C. players
Macclesfield Town F.C. players
Denaby United F.C. players
Matlock Town F.C. players
English Football League players